"Christmas This Year" is a Christmas song by American Christian hip hop recording artist TobyMac from his 2011 Christmas album Christmas in Diverse City. The song was released as a single on November 30, 2010. It features guest vocals from American singer and songwriter Leigh Nash. The song became Toby's fourth Hot Christian Songs No. 1 and Nash's first, staying there for two weeks. It lasted 5 weeks on the overall chart. The song is played in a B major key, and 95 beats per minute.

Background 
"Christmas This Year" was released as a single on November 30, 2010. It was later included in TobyMac's first Christmas album, Christmas In Diverse City. TobyMac said while talking about making the song, "Christmas is the most celebrated time of the year for my family. While we were recording the song, we had a week-long Christmas party at my house…in July!!! I wanted to write a song that captured that pure delight without missing the spirit of the season… when love came down to let us live."

Charts

References

2011 songs
2011 singles
American Christmas songs
TobyMac songs
Songs written by TobyMac
Songs written by Cary Barlowe
Songs written by Jesse Frasure